William Cruikshank may refer to:
William Cumberland Cruikshank (1745–1800), English anatomist
William Cruikshank (painter) (1848–1922), Scottish painter
William Cruickshank (chemist) (died 1810/11), chemist
William M. Cruikshank (1870–1943), American military officer